Timothy Floyd Burchett (born August 25, 1964) is an American politician who is the U.S. representative for , based in Knoxville, serving since 2019.

A Republican, Burchett was formerly mayor of Knox County, Tennessee. He served in the Tennessee General Assembly, first in the Tennessee House of Representatives, in which he represented Tennessee's 18th district. He later served in the Tennessee State Senate, representing the 7th district, part of Knox County.

Early life and education
Burchett is a native of Knoxville, where he was born in 1964 and attended West Hills Elementary School, Bearden Junior High School, and Bearden High School. After graduating from Bearden High School in 1981, he enrolled in the University of Tennessee in Knoxville, where he earned a B.S. degree in education. He is a member of the Sigma Chi fraternity.

State legislature
Burchett's first election to public office was in 1994, when he won a seat in the Tennessee House of Representatives. He served in the House for two two-year terms, from 1995 to 1998. In 1998, he won a four-year term in the Tennessee State Senate, representing the 7th district. He succeeded Clyde Coulter "Bud" Gilbert. He was reelected twice, serving a total of three four-year terms, from 1999 to 2010.

In 2006, while a state senator, Burchett failed to report six political action committee checks totaling $3,300. The Registry of Election Finance did not fine him. In 2008, while still a state senator, he was fined $250 for failing to disclose three PAC contributions that totaled $1,500.

Roadkill

In 1999, Burchett received national media attention for sponsoring a bill to legalize the eating of roadkill, wild animals killed by vehicles, before notifying the county game warden. He defended the proposal as a "common-sense thing" intended to prevent edible meat from being wasted. Eating roadkill was already legal – as it is in most places – but required prior notification of the county game warden. Burchett's bill allowed processing and consumption of roadkill before notifying the warden. Burchett proposed the bill after being contacted by a constituent who had been penalized for giving a needy family the meat from a deer his vehicle had accidentally hit.

Salvia divinorum
Burchett sponsored a bill in 2006 to make illegal "possessing, producing, manufacturing, distributing, or possessing with intent to produce, manufacture, or distribute the active chemical ingredient in the hallucinogenic plant Salvia divinorum in the state of Tennessee." He said, "We have enough problems with illegal drugs as it is without people promoting getting high from some glorified weed that's been brought up from Mexico. The only people I’ve heard from who are opposed to making it illegal are those who are getting stoned on it." The bill was signed into law on May 19, 2006, and went into effect on July 1, 2006. Burchett originally wanted to make violations a felony offense, but the bill was amended during its passage to make it a Class A misdemeanor.

In a news report published shortly before the signing of the bill by Governor Phil Bredesen, Burchett was quoted as saying, "it's not that popular but I'm one of those who believes in closing the barn door before the cows get out.... in certain hands, it could be very dangerous, even lethal." A store owner who had stopped selling the herb due to Burchett's bill said that he saw little point in banning salvia, "I have no idea why it's being outlawed. It's a sage. People in South America have been using it for years and years." The same report also gave the general counterargument of salvia proponents that legislation banning Salvia divinorum reflects a cultural bias, as there are fewer prohibitions on more addictive substances such as alcohol and nicotine, and questioned how effective the bill will be, pointing out that Salvia divinorum has no odor and is easy to grow, so enforcement will be difficult.

Knox County mayor

Burchett became Knox County mayor in September 2010, succeeding Mike Ragsdale, who left office due to term limits. Burchett defeated former Knox County Sheriff Tim Hutchison in the Republican primary and Democratic nominee Ezra Maize in the general election.

On February 10, 2012, Burchett appeared on WBIR-TV and officially announced that the county's first "cash mob" would be held at the Emory 5 & 10 store in South Knoxville. The cash mob gained national attention, and was mentioned in Time magazine.

In 2012, Tennessee's Registry of Election Finance unanimously decided to take no action against Burchett regarding an inquiry into his campaign disclosure forms.

U.S. House of Representatives

Elections 
2018

When 30-year incumbent Jimmy Duncan announced his retirement in July 2017, Burchett entered a crowded seven-way Republican primary to succeed him. He defeated his nearest challenger, state representative Jimmy Matlock, by just under 12 percentage points. He faced Democratic nominee Renee Hoyos in the November general election. The 2nd has long been a Republican stronghold. With a Cook Partisan Voting Index of R+20, it is one of the nation's most Republican districts, and tied for the third-most Republican district in Tennessee. It is one of the few ancestrally Republican districts in the South; the GOP and its predecessors have held it without interruption since 1859. For this reason, the Republican primary has long been reckoned as the real contest in this district. Democrats have not made a substantive bid for the seat since 1964, and have received as much as 40% of the vote only twice since then.

As expected, Burchett won the general election in a rout, taking 65.9% of the vote to Hoyos's 33.1%. When he took office in January 2019, Burchett became only the seventh person (not counting caretakers) to represent the 2nd since 1909. This district gives its representatives very long tenures in Washington; all six of Burchett's predecessors held the seat for at least 10 years, with three of them serving at least 20 years. He also ended a 54-year hold on the district by the Duncan family. John Duncan Sr. won the seat in 1964, and was succeeded upon his death in 1988 by his son, Jimmy.

In February 2018 the Knoxville News Sentinel reported that Burchett had failed to report a $10,000 payment from a solar electric company on his campaign finance forms and various financial disclosure forms. The story reported that two months earlier the FBI had questioned people about Burchett committing income tax evasion. After the story broke, Burchett gave a statement to WBIR that he was correcting errors in his campaign financial disclosures and income tax forms, describing his failure to report all income as an "oversight".

2020 

Burchett was reelected in 2020 with 67.6% of the vote, defeating Democrat Renee Hoyos.

Tenure

Texas v. Pennsylvania
In December 2020, Burchett was one of 126 Republican members of the House of Representatives to sign an amicus brief in support of Texas v. Pennsylvania, a lawsuit filed at the United States Supreme Court contesting the results of the 2020 presidential election, in which Joe Biden defeated incumbent Donald Trump. The Supreme Court declined to hear the case on the basis that Texas lacked standing under Article III of the Constitution to challenge the results of an election held by another state.

Iraq
In June 2021, Burchett was one of 49 House Republicans to vote to repeal the AUMF against Iraq.

Immigration
Burchett voted against the Further Consolidated Appropriations Act of 2020 which authorizes DHS to nearly double the available H-2B visas for the remainder of FY 2020.

Burchett voted against the Consolidated Appropriations Act (H.R. 1158), which effectively prohibits Immigration and Customs Enforcement from cooperating with the Department of Health and Human Services to detain or remove illegal alien sponsors of Unaccompanied Alien Children.

UFOs

Following a report published by the Office of the Director of National Intelligence on January 12, 2023, Burchett expressed his views about an alleged government coverup of the nature of UFOs, saying, "we've been covering this up since the '40s" and that he doesn't "trust [the] government, [and] there's an arrogance about it, and I think the American public can handle it."

On March 7, 2023, Burchett expanded on these claims, saying that UFO technology is possibly "being reverse-engineered right now" but we "don't understand" how it functions. He maintains that the U.S. has "recovered a craft at some point, and possible beings".

Syria
In 2023, Burchett was among 47 Republicans to vote in favor of H.Con.Res. 21, which directed President Joe Biden to remove U.S. troops from Syria within 180 days.

Committee assignments 
Committee on Foreign Affairs
Subcommittee on Africa, Global Health, Global Human Rights, and International Organizations
Subcommittee on Europe, Eurasia, Energy, and the Environment
Committee on Transportation

House Transportation & Infrastructure Committee

Subcommittee on Aviation
Subcommittee on Highways and Transit
Subcommittee on Railroads, Pipelines, and Hazardous Materials

Caucus memberships 

 House RV Caucus
Republican Study Committee

Electoral history

Personal life
In June 2008, Burchett married Allison Beaver in an impromptu ceremony conducted by Tennessee Governor Phil Bredesen. In April 2012, Beaver filed for divorce, citing "irreconcilable differences". The divorce was finalized later that year. In 2014, Burchett married Kelly Kimball. He later became a legal guardian to Kimball's daughter.

References

External links
 Congressman Tim Burchett official U.S. House website
Tim Burchett for Congress

Tim Burchett at Ballotpedia
Our Campaigns – Mayor Tim Burchett (TN) profile
Tim Burchett State Senate profile

|-

|-

|-

|-

1964 births
Heads of county government in Tennessee
Living people
Republican Party members of the Tennessee House of Representatives
Politicians from Knoxville, Tennessee
21st-century American politicians
Republican Party members of the United States House of Representatives from Tennessee
Republican Party Tennessee state senators
University of Tennessee alumni